The Slave is a 1917 American silent drama film written and directed by William Nigh. The film starred Valeska Surratt. It is now considered lost.

Plot
As described in a film magazine review, Caroline (Suratt) works at a hairdressing parlor. A wealthy man falls in love with her, takes her home in his automobile, and proposes on the curb. Caroline has a dream where she marries a man, who turns out to be penurious and keeps her locked up in his mansion. He finally dies, and Caroline starts out having a good time with his money, but she sees the folly of her ways. She wakes up from the dream and turns down the offer of marriage, deciding instead to wait several years for her honest young man to return from the west.

Cast
 Valeska Suratt - Caroline
 Violet Palmer - Dulce
 Eric Mayne - Dr. Atwell
 Herbert Heyes - David Atwell
 Edward Burns - Egbert Atwell (aka Edmund Burns)
 Edwin Roseman - Dr. Ghoul (*actor also known as Edward Roseman) 
 Dan Mason - The Fossil
 Tom Brooke - Professor Winther
 Martin Faust - Author
 Martin Hunt

References

External links
 
 
 
 

1917 films
1917 drama films
Fox Film films
Silent American drama films
American silent feature films
American black-and-white films
Films directed by William Nigh
Lost American films
1917 lost films
Lost drama films
1910s American films